Alan Quinlan (Irish: Ailín Ó Caoindealbhain, born 13 July 1974) is a retired Irish rugby union player. He played for Munster and was registered to All-Ireland League side Shannon. He retired from rugby in May 2011.

Early years
Quinlan was educated at Abbey CBS in Tipperary and worked for a motor dealer after leaving school. He began his rugby career with Clanwilliam FC. Quinlan moved from Clanwilliam to join Shannon U20s in 1994. He captained the Irish Youth Team against Scotland in 1993. He normally played as a blindside flanker, but he also played openside, number eight and second row for Munster.

Munster
Quinlan began playing for Munster in 1996 and captained the youths team before becoming a regular in the first team. In May 2006 he made a comeback from a cruciate ligament injury earlier in the season to win both the AIB League Division 1 title with Shannon and the Heineken Cup with Munster after a late appearance from the bench in the Heineken Cup Final win over Biarritz in Cardiff. He captained the side from Number Eight in Munster's upset victory over Ulster in Ravenhill in the 2007 Celtic League. Quinlan was voted Man of the Match as Munster beat Toulouse 16–13 on 24 May 2008 to win the Heineken Cup for a second time. He was part of the squad that won the 2008–09 Celtic League. In total he holds five league medals with Shannon, as well as two Heineken Cup medals and a Celtic League Medal with Munster. Quinlan won his 201st cap against Leinster, equalling Anthony Foley's club record for caps, on 2 October 2010. He became Munster's most capped player ever on 16 October 2010, against Toulon in the Heineken Cup. In the 2009–10 season he represented Munster 21 times, including all eight of their 2010 Heineken Cup matches.

In April 2011, Quinlan officially announced his retirement from professional rugby, to be effective at the end of the 2010/11 season. He played his last game for Munster on 6 May 2011, against Connacht in the Celtic League, scoring a try to mark the end of his remarkable career and going off to a standing ovation from the Munster and Connacht supporters. He joined the Munster team at the 2011 Celtic League Grand Final trophy presentation, celebrating Munster's 19–9 victory over old rivals Leinster in Thomond Park.

Ireland
Quinlan represented Ireland 'A' between 1998 and 2001 and made his senior debut for the Irish national team in October 1999, as a replacement in a test against Romania. He played his first Six Nations match against Italy in 2001. He was a part of Ireland's squad at the 2003 World Cup in Australia and scored two tries in the tournament before dislocating his shoulder scoring a vital try against Argentina in the pool stages, which ended his involvement. He was named in Ireland's 2007 World Cup squad but did not make any appearances. Ireland coach Eddie O'Sullivan was widely criticised afterwards for not using his bench. Quinlan took his caps to a total of 27 by playing in the Autumn Internationals of 2008 against Canada and the All Blacks.

British & Irish Lions
On 21 April 2009, Quinlan was named in the squad for the 2009 Lions tour of South Africa. During Munsters Heineken cup semi-final defeat to Leinster in May 2009, Quinlan was cited for making contact with the eye or eye area of Leinster captain Leo Cullen. The offence was deemed at the low range of seriousness and he received a 12 playing week ban until 9 September 2009. As a result, he missed the Lions tour to South Africa.

Post-retirement
Quinlan was a co-commentator for ITV's coverage of the 2011 World Cup. He regularly commentates with RTÉ and Sky Sports on their rugby coverage.

Personal life
Quinlan married Irish model Ruth Griffin in Tipperary town during the summer of 2008.
They have one son named AJ who was born in January 2009. They later split up in June 2010.

He released an autobiography, entitled 'Quinlan: Red Blooded', in 2010. Quinlan is a big golf fan and supports Liverpool.

Statistics

International analysis by opposition

Correct as of 5 July 2017

References

External links
Munster Profile
Ireland Profile
Pro14 Profile

1974 births
Living people
People educated at The Abbey School (Tipperary)
Rugby union players from County Tipperary
People from Tipperary (town)
Irish rugby union players
Munster Rugby players
Shannon RFC players
Ireland international rugby union players
Rugby union flankers
Rugby union number eights